Inbound may refer to:

 Inbound links, also called Backlinks - incoming links to a website.
 American Inbound - a company that provides outsourced customer relationship management
 Inbound students - students or scholars from a foreign country who participate in an academic program within the inviting country, from whose perspective the students are "inbound"
 Inbound - a direction of busses and trains that travel toward the city center
 (of the greater San Francisco Bay Area) towards or through downtown San Francisco, regardless of origin
Inbound - a rock band based out of Cranberry Township, Butler County, Pennsylvania.